Jody Adams may refer to:

 Jody Adams (basketball) (born 1972), basketball coach
 Jody Adams (chef), American chef and restaurateur